Francesco Focardi Mazzocchi (9 February 1949 – 11 January 2022) was an Italian Roman Catholic prelate, vicar apostolic of Camiri from 2009 to 2017. Focardi died on 11 January 2022, at the age of 72.

References

1949 births
2022 deaths
Apostolic vicars
21st-century Italian Roman Catholic bishops
People from the Province of Florence
Roman Catholic bishops of Camiri